Omran Kandi (also Romanized as ‘Omrān Kandī) is a village in Nazarkahrizi Rural District, Nazarkahrizi District, Hashtrud County, East Azerbaijan Province, Iran. At the 2006 census, its population was 481, in 92 families.

References 

Towns and villages in Hashtrud County